Madisonville Municipal Airport  is a city-owned, public-use airport located three nautical miles (6 km) southwest of the central business district of Madisonville, a city in Madison County, Texas, United States.

Facilities and aircraft 
Madisonville Municipal Airport covers an area of 40 acres (16 ha) at an elevation of 287 feet (87 m) above mean sea level. It has one runway designated 18/36 with an asphalt surface measuring 3,202 by 50 feet (976 x 15 m).

For the 12-month period ending July 31, 2011, the airport had 600 general aviation aircraft operations, an average of 50 per month. At that time there were two single-engine aircraft based at this airport.

References

External links 
 Airport page at City of Madisonville website
 Madisonville Municipal (51R) at TxDOT Airport Directory
 Aerial image as of January 1995 from USGS The National Map
 
 

Airports in Texas
Transportation in Madison County, Texas